David Laurence MacLaren  (October 27, 1893 – September 7, 1960) was a Canadian politician and the 20th Lieutenant Governor of New Brunswick.

Born in Saint John, New Brunswick, he was appointed Minister of National Revenue in April 1945 in the Liberal cabinet of Mackenzie King. He was defeated in the 1945 election in the riding of St. John—Albert. From 1945 until 1958, he was the Lieutenant-Governor of New Brunswick. He was elected mayor of Saint John again in 1958, and held the position until his death.

During World War I, he enlisted and served in the Canadian Expeditionary Force with the Royal Canadian Artillery, 7th Siege Battery. He fought at the Battle of Vimy Ridge, where he took a gunshot wound which necessitated the removal of his right leg above the knee. He recovered and received an artificial leg.

References

External links
Synopsis of federal political experience from the Library of Parliament

1893 births
1960 deaths
Canadian amputees
Candidates in the 1945 Canadian federal election
Liberal Party of Canada candidates for the Canadian House of Commons
Lieutenant Governors of New Brunswick
Mayors of Saint John, New Brunswick
Members of the King's Privy Council for Canada